Actinus is a genus of beetles of the Staphylinidae family, Staphylininae subfamily, first described by Charles Adolphe Albert Fauvel in 1878.

Species
From Biolib:
Actinus imperialis Fauvel, 1878
Actinus macleayi Olliff, 1887

References

External links
 Tolweb

Staphylininae
Taxa named by Charles Adolphe Albert Fauvel
Taxa described in 1878